Jin Di (born 15 December 1978 in Shanghai) is a male Chinese sports shooter who competed in Olympic skeet at the 2000 Summer Olympics, the 2004 Summer Olympics and the 2008 Summer Olympics.

References

External links
 profile

1978 births
Living people
Olympic shooters of China
Sport shooters from Shanghai
Shooters at the 2000 Summer Olympics
Shooters at the 2004 Summer Olympics
Shooters at the 2008 Summer Olympics
Skeet shooters
Asian Games medalists in shooting
Shooters at the 2002 Asian Games
Shooters at the 2006 Asian Games
Shooters at the 2010 Asian Games
Shooters at the 2014 Asian Games
Shooters at the 2018 Asian Games
Chinese male sport shooters
Asian Games gold medalists for China
Asian Games silver medalists for China
Asian Games bronze medalists for China
Medalists at the 2002 Asian Games
Medalists at the 2006 Asian Games
Medalists at the 2010 Asian Games
Medalists at the 2014 Asian Games
Medalists at the 2018 Asian Games
21st-century Chinese people